SPECS may refer to:

 SPECS (speed camera), a brand of speed cameras in the United Kingdom
 SPECS Sport, a shoe company from Indonesia
 Shaheen Public English Cambridge School, a school in Karachi
 Significantly Prettier and Easier C++ Syntax, a proposed, alternative syntactic binding for C++

See also
 Specs (disambiguation)